Ampache is a free software web-based audio file manager and media server. The name is a blend of the words "amplifier" and "Apache". It was originally written to take advantage of Apache's mod_mp3 module but has since been adapted to use its own streaming method. Ampache's Mascot is a squirrel called Fraz, originally drawn by Kirsten Petersen, later digitized by Ben Shields, and redesigned by Agnès Champavier in 2008.

History 
Ampache was released in 2001. Its original author, Scott Kveton went on to create the OSUOSL at Oregon State University and passed the developmental lead to Karl Vollmer who was responsible for it from early 2003 to early 2011. Since then, lead development of Ampache has changed hands several times. To date, Ampache has support from over 100 different contributors.

Development goals 
Ampache's goal is to allow access to one's music from anywhere in the world. It is written specifically for private and small group implementations, but does allow an admin to enable public registration. Ampache's primary objective is to maintain a simple, secure and fast web front end that will run on almost any hardware and any platform that supports PHP. It is also written to accommodate large music collections.

Extensions and APIs 
Ampache also provides an application programming interface (API) for extracting meta data in the form of XML documents. Ampache data can be accessed via the many methods supported in the API, originally created for use with Amarok2, but which can also be used to create other front-ends to Ampache. Access to the API is controlled by internal Access Control Lists; for performance reasons, all requests currently have a 5000 result limit. The following applications are known to have plug-ins that use Ampache's XML API:

 Amarok (2.x)
 Coherence (UPNP A/V MediaServer)
 Rhythmbox Plugin
 Terratec Noxon iRadio
 Ampache Mobile (WebOS Client)
 AmpachPre (WebOS Client)
 AmpacheX (iPod Touch/iPhone Application)
 iAmpache (iPod Touch/iPhone application)
 Ampacheberry (Ampache client for the BlackBerry)
 Ampache HTML5 Player (Google Chrome App)

Since version 3.7.0, Ampache is compatible with Subsonic clients and Plex clients.

Ampache and education
Ampache's features make it a powerful instructional and assistive technology for students with language-based learning differences. At the Chelsea School, a group of advanced technology students recognized Ampache's potential for providing important accommodations and modifications that serve their learning styles; they built and configured an Ampache server that was put to work to enhance teaching and learning in the classroom.

By adding audio recordings of instructional-level texts and assignments to an Ampache catalog, the instructor empowers students to individually and independently listen to a streaming text while reading a print version of the material; used in that way, Ampache allows students to avail themselves of curriculum material and instruction-level texts they may not otherwise have access to. Ampache thus serves as a compromise between three common accommodations: text-to-speech software, a human reader, and audiobooks.

Ampache's video-streaming features have also been used to enhance teaching and learning at the Chelsea School. Rather than having students watch instructional videos as a group, the assigned material was streamed to their individual workstations. Independent viewing reduces distractions, and allows students to progress at their own pace, pausing to take notes or repeating segments for clarification.

Publications 
Ampache has been featured in numerous online blogs and technical articles. The O'Reilly book Spidering Hacks details security testing of online applications. Ampache was found to be immune to standard spidering hacks, and by focusing on security during its development, has continued to be. The code philosophy listed on Ampache's wiki specifies security as one of the most important considerations during application development.

Version history

References

External links

 

Streaming software
Free multimedia software
Client/server media players
Media servers
Free media players
Software using the GNU AGPL license